Ocenebra chavesi is a species of sea snail, a marine gastropod mollusk in the family Muricidae, the murex snails or rock snails.

References

Ocenebra
Gastropods described in 1996